{{Infobox school
| name              = TED Kayseri College
| native_name       = 
| image             = 

| image_size        = 
| alt               = 
| caption           = 
| logo              = 
| motto             = Buradan ışık ve kutsallık doğar. (Hinc lucem et pocula sacra)
| established       = 
| closed            = 
| type              = Private co-educational
| status            = 
| category_label    = 
| category          = 
| gender_label      = 
| gender            = 
| affiliation       = 
| affiliations      = 
| administrator     = 
| assst_admin       = 
| president         = 
| chairman_label    = 
| chairman          = 
| rector            = 
| principal         = 
| asst principal    = 
| campus_director   = Arif Sırrı Şirin
| headmaster        = 
| head_name         = Second Master
| head              = 
| head_name2        = Assistant Headmaster
| head2             = 
| dean              = 
| founder           = Turkish Education Association, Mustafa Kemal Atatürk
| chaplain          = 
| officer_in_charge = 
| faculty           = 
| teaching_staff    = 157 Turkish 
| enrollment        = 
| grades_label      = 
| grades            = For Turks: 6, 7, 8, 9, 10, 11,12 For Turks and English: Prep, 9, 10, 11, 12 (1025)
| streetaddress     = 
| city              = Kayseri
| state             = 
| province          = 
| country           = Turkey
| coordinates       = 
| latitude          = 
| longitude         = 
| district          = Kocasinan
| oversight         = 
| accreditation     = 
| campus            = Fevzi Çakmak
| colors            = Navy blue, red
| colours           = 
| athletics         = 
| houses            = 
| student_union     = 
| nickname          = TED, college
| mascot            = 
| free_label        = Emblem
| free_text         = 
| rival             = 
| yearbook          = 
| newpaper          = 
| free_label_1      = 
| free_1            = 
| free_label_2      = 
| free_2            = 
| free_label_3      = 
| free_3            = 
| test_name         = 
| test_average      = 
| national_ranking  = 
| website           = 
| footnotes         = 
| picture           = 
| picture_caption   = 
| picture2          = 
| picture_caption2  = 
}}

TED Kayseri College was founded in 1966 in order enable all the children in Turkey to benefit from the equal and high-quality education opportunities. TED Kayseri College is the third largest school in TED. Its aim was to educate brilliant, multi-lingual, cultivated, and socially responsible students. Since its foundation thousands of students have graduated from the school.

Education
TED has a kindergarten, primary, junior high, and high school. All schooling is multi-lingual so students study English and Turkish from their nursery years. Students at kindergarten are prepared for primary school with a curriculum based on arts, sports, languages, and principle lessons. The primary and junior high school students continue their education with arts, sports, languages, and introductory lessons on applied and social sciences. In the tenth grade, high school students are separated into three departments, applied sciences, social sciences, and foreign languages, according to their abilities and the studies they want to pursue at college level. TED supports its students both in academic and social ways, and gives them the chance to study a second foreign language at high school level.

Admissions
TED accepts students to its high school based on an exam covering the junior high school curriculum. Students who  attain a specified grade get a full scholarship to the high school. The scholarship is not withdrawn unless the GPA of a student falls below 3.00/4.00.

Campus
TED is situated on a campus comprising  of land which contains parks, recreational areas, and a small zoo.  The school has an indoor gymnasium which has a five hundred person capacity where the students can play basketball, volleyball, badminton, and football. Outdoor sports areas consist of a tennis court, a volleyball court, two basketball courts, and two football pitches.

Each section of the school has chemistry, physics, and IT labs. There are also ballet, sculpture, art, and hand crafts workshops.  TED has state-of-the-art libraries in each school filled with sources related to the area of study the students are engaged in. The high school library has over seven thousand books, literary, cultural, and scientific magazines, and internet connected computers.

Student activities
Students can be involved in various clubs such as:

For those interested in journalism, student run publications are available:TED Science Storm: An annual applied sciences magazine where students can follow the novelties in science that year and demonstrate their own work.TED's Torch: An English magazine published each term where students can improve and demonstrate their English language skills by writing various articles for the magazine.Ekin:'': A literature magazine published each term where students can demonstrate their works of poetry, short stories, book reviews, or articles.

The school also has various sports teams such as basketball, volleyball, football, tennis, badminton, archery, swimming, and skiing.

The Student Union represents the students at TED.  Elected each fall by the students, the union holds meetings several times a year to discuss and resolve problems within the school.

See also
 List of high schools in Turkey
 ÖSS
 YGS-LYS

External links
Türk Eğitim Derneği
TED Kayseri Koleji

High schools in Kayseri
Educational institutions established in 1966
1966 establishments in Turkey
Kayseri